When Knighthood Was in Flower may refer to:

 When Knighthood Was in Flower (novel), the debut novel of American author Charles Major
 When Knighthood Was in Flower (1922 film), a 1922 silent historical film based on the novel
 The Sword and the Rose, a 1953 film  based on the novel, also known as When Knighthood Was in Flower in the United Kingdom